Maxim Zimin (born 28 April 1994 in Barnaul) is a former racing driver from Russia. He has previously competed in the GP3 Series.

Racing record

Career summary

† As he was a guest driver, Zimin was ineligible to score points.

Complete GP3 Series results
(key) (Races in bold indicate pole position) (Races in italics indicate fastest lap)

References

External links
 Profile at Driver Database

Russian racing drivers
1994 births
Living people
Russian GP3 Series drivers
Sportspeople from Barnaul
Jenzer Motorsport drivers
Formula Renault Eurocup drivers
Italian Formula Renault 2.0 drivers
Formula Abarth drivers